O'Connell's spiny-rat (Proechimys oconnelli) is a species of rodent in the family Echimyidae. It is endemic to Colombia.

Phylogeny
Morphological characters and mitochondrial cytochrome b DNA sequences showed that P. oconnelli belongs to the so-called semispinosus group of Proechimys species, and shares closer phylogenetic affinities with the other member of this clade: P. semispinosus.

References

Proechimys
Endemic fauna of Colombia
Mammals of Colombia
Mammals described in 1913
Taxonomy articles created by Polbot